The Spokane Valley–Rathdrum Prairie Aquifer is an aquifer in the northwest United States, located in eastern Washington and northern Idaho.

The aquifer is centralized under Spokane Valley and the Rathdrum Prairie, hence the name; it contains ten trillion gallons (38 trillion liters) of water, and is part of the Columbia River drainage basin. The only watercourse that remains above the surface for an extended distance is the Spokane River. The aquifer is the primary water source for the greater Spokane area, which is home to over 700,000 people in the Inland Empire.

References

Aquifers in the United States
Spokane, Washington
Coeur d'Alene, Idaho

External links
City of Spokane Public Works and Utilities